Motiur Rahman (1 December 1949 - 18 December 2007) was an Indian politician from the Rashtriya Janata Dal party who was a Member of the Rajya Sabha representing Bihar in the upper house of the Indian Parliament. He served as Member of the Bihar Legislative Assembly from Dhaka for two consecutive terms representing the Indian National Congress.

His son Faisal Rahman was an MLA from the Dhaka constituency.

References

External links
 Profile on Rajya Sabha website

Rashtriya Janata Dal politicians
Rahman Motiur
2007 deaths
Indian Muslims
1949 births